Intel Core 2 is the processor family encompassing a range of Intel's consumer 64-bit x86-64 single-, dual-, and quad-core microprocessors based on the Core microarchitecture. The single- and dual-core models are single-die, whereas the quad-core models comprise two dies, each containing two cores, packaged in a multi-chip module. The Core 2 range was the last flagship range of Intel desktop processors to use a front-side bus.

The introduction of Core 2 relegated the Pentium brand to the mid-range market, and reunified laptop and desktop CPU lines for marketing purposes under the same product name, which were formerly divided into the Pentium 4, Pentium D, and Pentium M brands.

The Core 2 processor line was introduced on July 27, 2006, comprising the Duo (dual-core) and Extreme (dual- or quad-core CPUs for enthusiasts), and in 2007, the Quad (quad-core) and Solo (single-core) sub-brands. Intel Core 2 processors with vPro technology (designed for businesses) include the dual-core and quad-core branches.

Although Woodcrest processors are also based on the Core architecture, they are available under the Xeon brand. From December 2006, all Core 2 Duo processors were manufactured from 300 millimeter plates at Fab 12 factory in Arizona and at Fab 24-2 in County Kildare, Ireland.

Virtual machine or virtualization abilities 
Core 2 and other LGA 775 processors can support virtualization if the virtual machine (VM) software supports those processors, e.g. if the processor supports VT-x.

Newer versions of VM software do not support processors older than Nehalem (Core 2 and older) because they lack support for Intel VT-x with Extended Page Tables (EPT), also called Second Level Address Translation (SLAT).

Models

The Core 2-branded CPUs include: Conroe/Allendale (dual-core for desktops), Merom (dual-core for laptops), Merom-L (single-core for laptops), Kentsfield (quad-core for desktops), and the updated variants named Wolfdale (dual-core for desktops), Penryn (dual-core for laptops) and Yorkfield (quad-core for desktops).

The Core 2-branded processors feature Virtualization Technology without EPT (with some exceptions), the NX bit and SSE3. The Core microarchitecture introduced SSSE3, Trusted Execution Technology, Enhanced SpeedStep and Active Management Technology (iAMT2). The Penryn microarchitecture, a shrink of the former, introduced SSE4.1. With a maximum thermal design power (TDP) of 65 W, the Core 2 Duo Conroe dissipates half the power of the less capable contemporary Pentium D-branded desktop chips that have a max TDP of 130 W.

Known marks
With the release of the Core 2 processor, the abbreviation C2 has come into common use, with its variants C2D (the present Core 2 Duo), and C2Q, C2E to refer to the Core 2 Quad and Core 2 Extreme processors respectively. C2QX stands for the Extreme-Editions of the Quad (QX6700, QX6800, QX6850).

The successors to the Core 2 brand are a set of Nehalem microarchitecture based processors called Core i3, i5, and i7. The Core i7 was officially launched on November 17, 2008 as a family of three quad-core processor desktop models; further models started appearing throughout 2009. The last processor of the family to be released was the Core 2 Quad Q9500 in January 2010. The Core 2 processor line was removed from the official price lists in July 2011, and the last processors were discontinued in June 2012.

See also
 Comparison of Intel processors
 List of Intel Core 2 processors

Notes

References

External links
1st public demonstration: Anandtech discovers Core 2 Duo performance under the supervision of Francois Piednoel
 Intel Penryn Architecture and Performance Preview
 Intel Centrino Duo Mobile Technology papers
 Intel Core Microarchitecture
 

Computer-related introductions in 2006
Core 2
64-bit microprocessors